Albany Stakes may refer to:

Albany Stakes (Great Britain), a horse race held at Ascot Racecourse in Great Britain
Albany Stakes (United States), a horse race held at Saratoga Race Course in the United States